The 2012–13 Drexel Dragons women's basketball team represented Drexel University during the 2012–13 NCAA Division I women's basketball season. The Dragons, led by tenth year head coach Denise Dillon, played their home games at the Daskalakis Athletic Center and were members of the Colonial Athletic Association (CAA). They finished the season 28–10, 13–5 in CAA play to finish in 3rd place. They advanced to the championship game of the CAA women's tournament where they were defeated by Delaware. They received an invitation to the Women's National Invitational Tournament where they won the championship, defeating Utah in the finals.

Off season

2012 Recruiting Class

Roster

Schedule

|-
!colspan=12 style=| Exhibition
|-

|-
!colspan=12 style=| Non-conference regular season

|-
!colspan=12 style=| CAA regular season

|-
!colspan=12 style=| CAA Tournament

|-
!colspan=12 style=| WNIT

Rankings

*AP does not release post-NCAA Tournament rankings

See also
2012–13 Drexel Dragons men's basketball team

References

Drexel Dragons women's basketball seasons
Drexel
Drexel
Drexel
Drexel
Women's National Invitation Tournament championship seasons